The enzyme phosphonopyruvate decarboxylase catalyzes the chemical reaction

3-phosphonopyruvate  2-phosphonoacetaldehyde + CO2

This enzyme belongs to the family of lyases, specifically the carboxy-lyases, which cleave carbon-carbon bonds.  The systematic name of this enzyme class is 3-phosphonopyruvate carboxy-lyase (2-phosphonoacetaldehyde-forming). This enzyme is also called 3-phosphonopyruvate carboxy-lyase.  This enzyme participates in aminophosphonate metabolism.

References

 
 
 

EC 4.1.1
Enzymes of unknown structure